Sitaram Lalas (29 December 1912 – 29 December 1986) (known as Sita Ramji maadsaab) was a linguist and lexicographer of India.

He produced a written dictionary of the Rajasthani language – first ever in the language with name: Rajasthani Shabd (Sabada) Kosh and Rajasthani Hindi Brihad Kosha. This perhaps is one of the voluminous dictionaries of the world consisting of more than  words. The dictionary contains not only the meanings but the origin, synonyms, idioms and phrases based upon each word. It is named Rajasthani Bhasha-Sahitya evam Vyakarana and was first published in 1962.The volume was acclaimed as a significant academic work by national and international scholars. The volume included two hundred thousand (200,000) words.

Dr Sitaram Lalas devoted 40 years in the compilation of this outstanding work and was awarded Padma Shri in 1977 for his contribution. He was also awarded honorary doctorate by Jai Narain Vyas University (Jodhpur University). Dr Lalas was also known for his excellent knowledge of Ayurveda besides being remembered as a great teacher. Dr Sita Ram Lalas was from Charan community.

Dr. Sitaram Lalas was rightly called promoter of Rajasthani language and was given due honour and respect as grammarian and lexicographer of yester years like Panini, Patanjali and Dr. Johnson. Scholars like W.S. Allen and Bhagwat Sharan Upadhaya have termed Dr. Sitaram Lalas' work as unprecedented and revolutionary. Though Dr. Lalas was a modest school teacher, by way of his commitment, sincerity and devotion, he presented a unique example – compiling a comprehensive dictionary of the Rajasthani language comprising nine volumes and an abridged dictionary. Apart from this, his other publications include – work on Rajasthani grammar, history of Rajasthani language and literature. He edited a dozen of Rajasthani classics.

Dr. Lalas' extensive and sincere work has administered a life-giving dose of renaissance to the Rajasthani language. Jai Narain Vyas University (Jodhpur University) conferred upon him, honorary degree of the doctor of literature in recognition to his work. The president of India honoured Dr. Lalas with Padma Shri, fourth highest civilian award in the Republic of India. Sahitya Academy Sangam honoured Dr. Lalas with Manishee award. Some of the key highlights of his life and work are as below:-

 The literary ruler of Marwar (Jodhpur) 'Maharaja Mansigh' (1803–1843), honoured 61 Charan poets by giving them "The Hathi Siropao" (Haathi Siripao) (Refer Note a.). Navalji Lalas (1787–1832) of Judia Village, known as Voltaire of Marwar was one of them.  On account of this honour Navalji was presented SANSAN (Tax free fief) (Refer Note b.) village Narava 34 km north west of Jodhpur.  Generation of Navalji included Peerdanji, Harudanji and Hathiramji. Dr. Lalas was born on 29 December 1908, to Hathiramji and Jawahar Bai (daughter of Sadulji Bogsa and Singaran Bai of village Sarvari Charnan).
 When Hathi Ramji died, Sitaram was only two and a half years. His maternal grand father, Sadul Danji Bogsa (1833–1916), a prominent scholar and poet of Rajasthani, took the task of Sita Ram's education. After Sadul Danji died, Sita Ram stayed in his village and sometimes in Sarvari, the village of his mother.  He took his education in grammar and arithmetic from Amtuji Shreemali of village Khandap. Meanwhile, he also learned Dingal geet, an art of old Rajasthani poetry stanzas, from elderly persons of village Sarvari. His inclination towards Dingal stanzas and poetic compositions grew after coming in contact with Panna Ramji Maharaj, an elderly scholar. He also learned the culture and history from his maternal grand mother (maasa) – Singara Bai. Note – Dingal geet (stanzas) are peculiar style of old Rajasthani classical poetry.
 At the age of 16, having completed his formal school education, Sitaramji came to the town of Jodhpur, on advice of Panna Ramji Maharaj and stayed in Charan hostel. His educational expenses were borne by an elderly businessman of Sarvari village.  The manager of the hostel Gulab Chand Churamani, was kind to him, whereby he got admission in Rajmahal School, from where he passed his special eighth class, from Marwar Middle board with excellency and double promotion.
 In 1928, he became a teacher in Chainpura School (Mandore, Jodhpur), while still continuing with his studies. He got his education of Sanskrit and grammar from Pandit Bhagwati Lalji Shastri, and Pandit Somendra, a visually challenged scholar.
 In 1930, he was posted to Vidyashala for School Teacher's Training. After the training, he was appointed in Bagar school, Jodhpur in 1931. During this period, he came in contact with Shri Kesari Singh Barahath, a freedom fighter, and his brother Kishore Singh Brahaspatya, whom he supported with zeal and enthusiasm.
 During these days, he came in contact with the Rajasthani poet Amritlalji Mathur. Through him, he came in contact with the library superintendent of Jaipur state Pandit Hari Narayanji Purohit (Pareekh). With inspiration from Hari Narayanji Purohit, he started work related to Rajasthani literature and history for Nagari Pracharini Sabha, Benaras.
 In 1931 he edited the book 'Virad Shrigar' which was an abridged edition of the book 'Suraj Prakash'. This book is in poetic form and highlights the victory achievements of Maharaja Abhay Singh of Marwar in war against Sarbuland Khan of Gujarat.
 Purohit Hari Narayanji gave Sitaram an old Rajasthani dictionary "Nam Mala". After studying it, Sitaram in his letter to Hari Narayanji, dated 4 April 1932 observed – "The dictionary is not useful in modern times."Purohitji took remark seriously and rebuked young Sitaram. In his letter Purohitji asked Sitaram to first compile a dictionary and then criticise. This stern advice from the old man pierced Sitaram's heart, and this proved a turning point in the creation of modern Rajasthani language dictionary.
 From 1937 to 1940, while living in Bilara, he came in contact with he Diwan – Hari Singh ji, and was able to study the manuscripts of Aaimata Temple library, which was based in an underground. Once as he was reading the manuscripts, he fell down some 45 feet from the stairs and suffered brain haemorrhage and went into coma. With the help of Diwan Hari Singhji he was taken to Jodhpur, and after long treatment, and with the help of his friend Ladhu Ramji Maharaj, he was able to work again.
 In 1937 he won a legal case against an obscene book. Due to this the writer of the book so called monk poised him, but he survived after the treatment.
 During his stay in Bilara, in 1939 Sitaram wrote a brief history of Aai Mata – the goddess of Seervi caste. He also coordinated with Shiv Singh Choyal – a Seervi leader and opened a school for educating people with poor economic background. He also assisted in editing voluminous books of kashi Nagari Pracharini Sabha, apart from editing the 'Haala Jhala Ra Kundaliyan' and 'Banki Das Granthawali'. He also coordinated with Kishore Singh Brahaspatya – younger brother of the freedom fighter Kesari Singh Barahath, to edit an important Dingal book Hariras of Barahath (Barath) Isar Das in 1938.
 In 1941, when Sitaram got his transfer to Mathania, he gained a lot of literary knowledge after coming in contact with Panaramji Maharaj. Sitaram had discussion with Panaramji related to Dingal vocabulary during the latter's stay from 1941 to 1944.
 Sanskrit Society Ayodhya conferred upon him the degree of 'Sahitya Bhushan' in 1945, for his knowledge of Sanskrit literature and language.
 During this time Akhil Rajasthani Bhasha Sammelan was convened, under the chairmanship of Jai Narayan Vyas. Sitaramji was nominated the executive vice-president of the convention.
 In 1945 he edited Barahath (Barath) Laldan's book 'Shivdan Sujas Roopak'. This book contains poetic description of war against 'Talpuria Talpur of Sindh (Umerkot)' by the Jodhpur Army under commander Shivdan Singh Rathore in 1783, in which he was a victorious martyr. This was during the time of Maharaja Vijay Singhji of Jodhpur Rulers of Marwar.
 In 1946, he edited a book, Prem Singh Roopak by Gaadan Pratapji. The book in poetry form highlights the war achievements of Thakur Prem Singh of village Ladie in war against mutiny of Vishan Singh Meratia. This was in the Kingdom of Maharaja Takhat Singhji of Jodhpur.Rulers of Marwar
 During 1941–44, he completed his task of model Rajasthani Dictionary containing approximately fifty five thousand words. Due to the death of Purohit Hari Narayanji, in 1945, the dictionary could not be published.
 During 1946–47, he was terminated from Government Service on the charge of involvement in freedom movement and close contact with freedom fighters, but he was reinstated after the independence.
 In 1953, he forwarded a sixty five thousand word list to Sardul Rajasthani Research Institute Bikaner for publication, but publication could not be arranged.
 In 1954, on the advice of W.S. Allen, professor of Philology, University of Cambridge, he completed the first standard Rajasthani Grammar Book.
 After the establishment of the Rajasthan Oriental Research Instituteby the Government in Jodhpur, Sitaram came in contact with Manishi Muni Jinvijayji and undertook the work of editing the book 'Granth Raghunath Roopak' – with Dingal (old Rajasthani stanzas) of Kishna Adha in 1959.
 In 1955, Chopasni Siksha Samiti established the Rajasthani Research Institute (http://chopasnishikshasamiti.org/raj%20shodh.html)in Jodhpur for research work and publication of old literature. Members of the society like Mr. Goverdhan Singh Meratia, I.A.S Indian Administrative Service, Col. Shyam Singh Rodala, and Thakur Bhairo Singh Khejadla, MLA Member of the Legislative Assembly, advised the taking over of the publication work of the Rajasthani – Hindi dictionary compiled by Sitaram Lalas.
 In addition to the work of the 'Rajasthani Shabd Kosh' Sitaram Lalas assisted as an advisor and column writer in 'Parampara' the research magazine of the institute from 1955 to 1957.
 In 1958, the work of the 'Rajasthani Shabd Kosh' (Rajasthani – Hindi Dictionary) was handed over to Rajasthani Research Institute. The dictionary was the work of Sitaram Lalas and he was made the editor.
 In 1962, the first part of the dictionary was published. The work was appreciated widely. Scholars termed it as epoch-marking work.
 The editing work of 'Suraj Prakash' of Kavia Karnidan, which was started long back, was given a practical shape, and its three volumes were published in 1960, 61 and 63 respectively. The book contained the war achievements of the victorious Maharaja Abhay Singh of Jodhpur against Sarbuland Khan of Ahmedabad. The book was published by Rajasthan Oriental Research Institute, Government of Rajasthan, Jodhpur.
 Besides all the work, he edited he work 'Gajgun Roopak Baandh' written by Gadan Keshav Das which was published by Rajasthan Oriental Research Institute in 1967. The book is a war achievement of victorious Maharaja Gajsingh Rulers of Marwar of Marwar in war against rebellious Khurram at Hajipur.
 The Chopasni Shiksha Samiti (http://chopasnishikshasamiti.org/index.html) formed a separate sub committee for the work of the publication of Rajasthani Dictionary on advice of Mr. Anil Bordia I.A.S., Indian Administrative Service, the Director of Education at that time. After this the remaining eight volumes were published between 1967 and 1978.
 After completing the work of comprehensive dictionary, Sitaram Lalas started the work of abridged Rajasthani Dictionary (Rajasthani – Hindi Sankshipt Shabda Kosh), which was published in two volumes in 1986 and 1987 by Rajasthan Oriental Research Institute, Jodhpur, having two lakh words approximately.
 He produced a new Rajasthani Grammar, published by Rajasthani Bhasha Sahitya and Sanskriti Academy, Bikaner in 2003.

Notes 

a. 'Hathi Siriao' (or Hathi Siropao) was an honour bestowed upon a person, by which the person would become financially capable of maintaining an elephant
b. 'Sansan' – an estate given by the King in which there was not tax on levy liability

Awards and honours 
 In 1967 Rajasthan Sahitya Academy Sangam Udaipur awarded him 'Sahityakar Samman' and nominated him a member of Saraswati Sabha.
 In 1973 he was decorated with the title of 'Maneeshi' by Rajasthan Sahitya Academy Sangam, Udaipur. It was the highest award by the Academy.
 An honorary degree of doctor of literature Doctor of Letters was conferred upon him by Jai Narain Vyas University in 1976.
 In view of his contribution to the Rajasthani language and literature, the President of India conferred upon him Padma Shri, fourth highest civilian award in the Republic of India, in 1977. 
 In 1981, he was honoured by the Rajasthani Bhasha Pracharni Sabha with the Title 'Rajasthan Ra Ratan' (Gem of Rajasthan).
 He was decorated by Governor of Rajasthan Governors of states of India by the State Award in 1985.
 He was honoured with Sarvoch Bhasha Samman by Rajasthani Bhasha Sahitya and Sanskriti Academy, Bikaner in 1986.
 Sitaram Lalas died at the age of 78, on 29 December 1986. In July 1987, Jodhpur Municipal Corporation named he road near his residence in Shastri Nagar as 'Dr. Sitaram Lalas Marg'.
 EMRC unit in the MBM Engineering College Jai Narain Vyas University produced a forty-minute documentary film on the life and work of Sitaram Lalas in 1999–2000.
 Kendriya Sahitya Academy New Delhi published a monograph about the work and personality of Sitaram Lalas titled 'Bhartiya Sahitya Ra Nirmata'. The book was published in 2006.
 In 2008 on the occasion of the centenary celebrations of Sitaram Lalas, the Jodhpur Administration erected a statue of Sitaram Lalas' at the Gaurav Path Jodhpur
 In 2008 on the occasion of centenary celebrations, the Kendriya Sahitya Academy organised a three-day workshop and seminar on the work and personality of Sitaram Lalas at Ajmer in co-ordination with Rajasthani Bhasha Sahitya and Sanskriti Academy, Bikaner.
 Volumes of Rajasthani Shabda Kosh were out of print. The Human Resources Ministry, Government of India, allotted a budget of INR Nine Lakhs (0.9 Million) for a digital edition of the Shabd Kosh of Sitaram Lalas in 2009.
 On the occasion of Sitaram Lalas Smriti Samaroh on 29 December 2009, under the chairmanship of State Minister for Panchayati Raj, Government of Rajasthan, a resolution was accepted unanimously to release a commemorative postage stamp on Sitaram Lalas.
 The Encyclopædia Britannica addressed Sitaram Lalas as torch of Rajasthani Language

Further reading 

Dr. Sitaram Lalasʼs Interview about Rajasthani Language (Vol. I)
Dr. Sitaram Lalasʼs Interview about Rajasthani Language (Vol. II)

References 

Chopasani Shiksha Samiti Jodhpur (Raj.) Rajasthani Sabad Kosh

Rajasthani-language writers
Indian lexicographers
20th-century Indian linguists
Recipients of the Padma Shri in literature & education
Rajasthani people
Scholars from Rajasthan
Charan
20th-century lexicographers

1908 births
1986 deaths

People from Jodhpur